Jules Brateau (also known as Jules Paul Brateau) was a French sculptor, goldsmith, jeweller and pewter-worker.  He was born on 2 November 1844 in Bourges and died on 23 October 1923 in Fécamp.

Brateau was part of a revival in the use of pewter in decorative objects, and won a gold medal at the 1889 Universal Exposition.  After training as a woodcarver under Honorè Bourdoncle, from 1874 he worked as an engraver for jewellery companies such as Vever and Boucheron.  In 1878 he began to work in pewter.  He was made a member of Légion d'honneur in 1894, and was a member of the jury at the 1900 Universal Exposition.  His work, L'Olivier (The Olive Tree) was one of two pieces chosen to represent pewterwork at the 1900 Universal Exposition.

Several of his creations are part of the Musée d'Orsay collection and some are found in the Metropolitan Museum of Art.

References

1844 births
1923 deaths
19th-century French sculptors
French male sculptors
20th-century French sculptors
Artists from Bourges
Recipients of the Legion of Honour
19th-century French male artists